Richard J M Emanuel (born 29 October 1967) is a British businessman and investor. He founded his first company DX Communications at the age of 23, which grew from a one person start-up to an organisation of over 1,000 people within a 5-year period. The company was acquired by British Telecom's subsidiary BT Cellnet in September 1999. Following this, Emanuel has gone on to build a number of successful companies.

Emanuel remains active in the technology sector, with a focus on working with high-growth companies. In March 2020 he joined the Executive Team of MARSS Group, a technology security company, and one of the fastest growing privately owned businesses in Europe. He is also the non-exec Chairman of EIP Limited, a Insurtech, supplying corporate clients with subscription insurance and claims management.

Alongside this, Emanuel also has a personal interest in the healthy ageing sector. In 2016 he co-founded Lumity, and in 2020 co-founded Brain Health Network  - an organisation dedicated to helping people keep their brain healthy and lower the risk of neurodegenerative diseases such as Alzheimer's (the most common type of dementia). He has received various awards and recognition during his business career, including an MBE received from Queen Elisabeth II in 2000. He has also been a member of the Young Presidents' Organization since 2000, and is a past chairman of their Monaco chapter.

Early life 
Richard Emanuel was born on 29 October 1967, to academics Lois Emanuel (née Metcalfe) and Dr Ronald Emanuel. He spent his early life in the city of Glasgow attending Hutchesons' Grammar School. He was active in sports, excelling in both boxing and swimming.

Early career 
In 1990, Emanuel founded his first company, DX Communications, which operated in the cellular telecoms sector. The company was a one person start-up and was funded initially by his own savings and a £500 loan from his grandmother, Ivy. In the years that followed, DX grew to an organisation of over 1,000 people, with operations across the UK. In September 1999, the company was acquired by British Telecom's subsidiary BT Cellnet for a reported £42m. Emanuel remained active in the telecom and technology sector through the 2000s, building a number of companies in mainland Europe and North Africa.

Business career 
Emanuel's primary business and investment focus is working with high-growth technology companies.

In March 2020 he joined the Executive Team of MARSS Group, a technology company focused on the protection of lives and critical infrastructure, and one of the fastest-growing companies in Europe. His role at the company is Executive Chairman.

He also has a personal interest in the healthy ageing space. He is the co-founder of Lumity Life, a company providing a healthy ageing and immune support supplement range, and in 2020, co-founded Brain Health Network, an organisation dedicated to helping people lower their risk of dementia and to keep their brain healthy as they age. He became interested in the emerging research indicating that it is possible to significantly lower the risk of developing neurodegenerative diseases such as Alzheimer’s (the most common type of dementia) – in part by maintaining a healthy brain. This area is of personal importance for Emanuel, whose mother had dementia.

Personal life 
In 2008 Emanuel married Judith Halmshaw, a businesswoman and founder of the men's yoga wear brand Warrior Addict  in Beaulieu-Sur-Mer in the South of France. The couple, who have two children, a girl and a boy, lived together in Monaco before they separated on amicable terms in 2016.

Awards and nominations
Emanuel has received various business awards and honours throughout his career including an MBE presented by Queen Elisabeth at Buckingham Palace in 2000.

References 

1967 births
Living people
People educated at Hutchesons' Grammar School
20th-century British businesspeople
21st-century British businesspeople
British telecommunications industry businesspeople
British company founders